Marisa Tomei (born December 4, 1964) is an American actress. She was a cast member on the Cosby Show spin-off A Different World in 1987. For her role in the 1992 comedy My Cousin Vinny, she won the Academy Award for Best Supporting Actress. She has received two additional Oscar nominations for In the Bedroom (2001) and The Wrestler (2008), with the latter also earning her nominations at the BAFTA and Golden Globe Awards.

Tomei has appeared in a number of notable films, including Chaplin (1992),  (1994), What Women Want (2000), Before the Devil Knows You're Dead (2007), The Ides of March (2011), Crazy, Stupid, Love (2011), Parental Guidance (2012), Love Is Strange (2014), and The Big Short (2015). She also portrayed May Parker in the Marvel Cinematic Universe (MCU), having appeared in Captain America: Civil War (2016), Spider-Man: Homecoming (2017), Avengers: Endgame (2019), Spider-Man: Far From Home (2019), and Spider-Man: No Way Home (2021).

Tomei was formerly involved with the Naked Angels Theater Company and appeared in Daughters (1986) before making her Broadway debut in Wait Until Dark (1998). She earned a nomination for the Drama Desk Award for Outstanding Featured Actress in a Play for her role in Top Girls (2008), and a special Drama Desk Award for The Realistic Joneses (2014). She returned to Broadway in the revival of The Rose Tattoo in 2019.

Early life
Tomei was born on December 4, 1964, in Brooklyn, New York, to Adelaide "Addie" (née Bianchi), an English teacher, and Gary A. Tomei, a trial lawyer. She has a younger brother, actor Adam Tomei, and was partly raised by her paternal grandparents. Tomei's parents are both of Italian descent; her father's ancestors came from Tuscany, Calabria, and Campania, while her mother's ancestors are from Tuscany and Sicily. She graduated from Edward R. Murrow High School in 1982.

Tomei grew up in the Midwood neighborhood of Brooklyn. While there, she became captivated by the Broadway shows to which her theater-loving parents took her and was drawn to acting as a career. At Andries Hudde Junior High School, she played Hedy LaRue in a school production of How to Succeed in Business Without Really Trying. She also attended Albee School Of Dance. After graduating from high school, she attended Boston University for a year.

Career

1980s: Early work

Tomei followed up As the World Turns in 1986 with a role on the sitcom A Different World as Maggie Lauten during the first season. Her film debut was a minor role in the 1984 comedy film The Flamingo Kid, in which she played Mandy, a waitress. She had only one line in the film. During this phase, she made her stage debut in 1987 at the age of 22 in the off-Broadway play Daughters, playing Cetta. The role earned her rave reviews and the Theatre World Award for outstanding debut on stage.

Despite popular rumor. Tomei was not in the 1984 horror movie, The Toxic Avenger.

1990s: Breakthrough with My Cousin Vinny
Following several small films, including Oscar, Tomei came to international prominence with her comedic performance in the 1992 film My Cousin Vinny, for which she received critical praise.

Critic Vincent Canby wrote, "Ms. Tomei gives every indication of being a fine comedian, whether towering over Mr. Pesci and trying to look small, or arguing about a leaky faucet in terms that demonstrate her knowledge of plumbing. Mona Lisa is also a first-rate auto mechanic, which comes in handy in the untying of the knotted story." For her performance, Tomei was named Best Supporting Actress at the 1993 Academy Awards, prevailing over Miranda Richardson, Joan Plowright, Vanessa Redgrave and Judy Davis.

American film critic Rex Reed created controversy (and a minor Hollywood myth) when he suggested that Jack Palance had announced the wrong name after opening the envelope. While this allegation was repeatedly disproved—even the Academy officially denied it—Tomei called the story "extremely hurtful". A Price Waterhouse accountant explained that if such an event had occurred, "we have an agreement with the Academy that one of us would step on stage, introduce ourselves, and say the presenter misspoke." In 2015, when The Hollywood Reporter polled hundreds of academy members, asking them to re-vote on some past decisions, academy members indicated that, given a second chance, they would still award the 1992 Best Supporting Actress award to Tomei.

After her Oscar win, Tomei appeared as silent film star Mabel Normand in the film Chaplin, with her then-boyfriend Robert Downey Jr. playing Charlie Chaplin. The following year, she starred in the romantic drama Untamed Heart with Christian Slater, for which they won the MTV Movie Award for Best Kiss. Tomei had won the previous year for Best Breakthrough Performance for My Cousin Vinny. The next year, Tomei appeared alongside Downey again in the romantic comedy Only You. She then appeared in Nick Cassavetes' Unhook the Stars. Of Tomei's performance, Stephen Holden of The New York Times compared her favorably to the film's star, Gena Rowlands, writing, "Ms. Tomei is equally fine as Mildred's [Rowlands' character's] younger, hot-tempered neighbor, whose raw working-class feistiness and bluntly profane vocabulary initially repel the genteel older woman." She received her first Screen Actors Guild award nomination for Outstanding Female Supporting Actor for her performance. In 1998, she was nominated for the American Comedy Award for Funniest Supporting Actress for Tamara Jenkins' cult film Slums of Beverly Hills. The independent feature was well received by critics and the public, with Janet Maslin of The New York Times writing, "Jenkins makes the most of an especially ingratiating cast, with Ms. Tomei very charming and funny as Rita," and Emanuel Levy of Variety describing Tomei as "spunky and sexy... more subdued than she usually is." Tomei spent several years away from high-profile roles and major motion pictures in the late 1990s before rising again to prominence in the early 2000s.

During the 1990s, Tomei made several television appearances. In 1996, she made a guest appearance on the sitcom Seinfeld, playing herself in the two-part episode "The Cadillac". In the episode, George Costanza attempts to get a date with her through a friend of Elaine Benes. She also made an appearance on The Simpsons as movie star Sara Sloane, who falls in love with Ned Flanders. Former Saturday Night Live cast member Jay Mohr wrote in his book Gasping for Airtime that as guest host in October 1994 Tomei insisted that the proposed sketch "Good Morning Brooklyn" not be used because she did not like the idea of being stereotyped. This displeased SNL's writers and performers given the show's penchant for satirizing celebrities. Tomei did parody her My Cousin Vinny role and its considerable Brooklyn influence in a skit spoofing the 1995 O.J. Simpson murder trial.

2000s: In the Bedroom and The Wrestler

Tomei appeared in the 2000 film What Women Want, a commercial success, and had a supporting role in the romantic comedy Someone Like You. In 2001, she appeared in Todd Field's Best Picture nominee In the Bedroom, earning several awards including a ShoWest Award for Best Supporting Actress in 2002. Variety wrote, "Tomei is winning in what is surely her most naturalistic and unaffected performance," while The New York Times writer Stephen Holden exclaimed, "Ms. Tomei's ruined, sorrowful Natalie is easily her finest screen role." In the Bedroom earned Tomei a second Academy Award nomination and her first Golden Globe Award nomination for Best Supporting Actress. Tomei also shared a Screen Actors Guild Award nomination for Outstanding Performance by a Cast. In 2002, she appeared in the Bollywood-inspired film The Guru and voiced the role of Bree Blackburn, one of the two main antagonists in the animated feature film The Wild Thornberrys Movie.

In 2003, Tomei appeared in one of her biggest commercial hits, Anger Management. The following year, she appeared in the film Alfie, based on the 1966 British film of the same name. In 2006, Tomei had a recurring role in Rescue Me, playing Johnny Gavin's ex-wife Angie. She won a Gracie Allen Award for Supporting Actress in a Drama Series for her work in the four episodes in which she appeared. The following year, she appeared in the comedy Wild Hogs. The film was the 13th-highest-grossing movie of 2007 ($168,273,550 domestic box office). She also starred in the Sidney Lumet-directed Before the Devil Knows You're Dead.

In 2008, Tomei played Cassidy/Pam, a struggling stripper, in the Darren Aronofsky film The Wrestler. She appeared in several nude dance numbers in the film. Aronofsky said, "This role shows how courageous and brave Marisa is. And ultimately she's really sexy. We knew nudity was a big part of the picture, and she wanted to be that exposed and vulnerable." Numerous critics heralded this performance as a standout in her career. The Hollywood Reporter wrote, "Tomei delivers one of her most arresting performances, again without any trace of vanity." Ty Burr of The Boston Globe wrote, "Tomei gives a brave and scrupulously honest performance, one that's most naked when Pam has her clothes on." Variety exclaimed, "Tomei is in top, emotionally forthright form as she charts a life passage similar to Pam's." For her performance she was nominated for her first BAFTA, second Golden Globe and third Academy Award for Best Supporting Actress. In 2009, Tomei recorded the role of Mary Magdalene in Thomas Nelson's audio Bible production The Word of Promise.

2010s–present: Continued screen work

In 2010, Tomei appeared in Cyrus, a comedy-drama co-starring John C. Reilly and Jonah Hill. Tomei hosted the 2011 Scientific and Technical Awards, which was followed by an appearance at the 83rd Academy Awards. She starred in the mystery-suspense film The Lincoln Lawyer. She also appeared in Salvation Boulevard, which premiered at the 2011 Sundance Film Festival. Tomei's other 2011 films included Crazy, Stupid, Love and the George Clooney film The Ides of March. She is in talks to star in the indie comedy Married and Cheating. In an interview, Lady Gaga said she would want Tomei to portray her in a film about the singer. Tomei responded, "I was thrilled when I heard. I love her. I love her music. And she's an awesome businesswoman. So I was so touched, really. I think it's incredible that she likes my work and that she'd think of me."

Tomei was featured in the second episode of the third season of NBC's Who Do You Think You Are?, on February 10, 2012. In the episode, she traveled to Tuscany and to the island of Elba to uncover the truth about the 100-year-old murder of her great-grandfather, Francesco Leopoldo Bianchi.

Tomei portrayed a single mom back in school at Binghamton University taking a class taught by Hugh Grant in  Marc Lawrence’s 2014 written and directed The Rewrite. In 2018, Tomei played Dr. May Updale in The First Purge. She portrays Aunt May in the Marvel Cinematic Universe, appearing in Captain America: Civil War (2016), Spider-Man: Homecoming (2017), Avengers: Endgame (2019), Spider-Man: Far From Home (2019) and Spider-Man: No Way Home (2021). She was also cast to play All in the Family’s Edith Bunker in ABC’s Live in Front of a Studio Audience specials.

Public image 
She has been highly ranked on various magazines' most attractive lists. In 2009, Tomei was placed at number 18 on the FHM's 100 Sexiest Women list.

During her career, she has appeared on the cover of numerous lifestyle and fashion magazines, such as Vogue Greece, Paper, Redbook, Shape, Gotham and More. In 2005, she was featured in an advertising campaign and a television commercial for clothing retailer Hanes alongside Michael Jordan, Damon Wayans, and Matthew Perry. She appeared in Céline's fall 2014 campaign, and has also appeared in campaigns for Briggs & Riley and Coach, Band of Outsiders.

Personal life

Between 2008 and 2012, Tomei was in a relationship with actor Logan Marshall-Green. They were rumored to be engaged, but a representative for Tomei denied this. Tomei said in 2009, "I'm not that big a fan of marriage as an institution, and I don't know why women need to have children to be seen as complete human beings."

Tomei has supported voting, drawing attention to the Voter ID assistance available through VoteRiders.

Tomei was featured in two programs dealing with genealogical research: Who Do You Think You Are? and the PBS program Finding Your Roots. Researchers mapped out Tomei's family tree and analyzed her DNA. When Tomei's friend, actress Julianne Moore, appeared on Finding Your Roots, Tomei and Moore learned they are distant cousins.

Awards and nominations

References

External links 

 
 
 
 
 

1964 births
Living people
20th-century American actresses
21st-century American actresses
Actresses from New York City
American film actresses
American people of Italian descent
American soap opera actresses
American stage actresses
American television actresses
American voice actresses
Belly dancers
Best Supporting Actress Academy Award winners
Boston University alumni
Drama Desk Award winners
Edward R. Murrow High School alumni
People from Midwood, Brooklyn
People of Calabrian descent
People of Campanian descent
People of Sicilian descent
People of Tuscan descent
Theatre World Award winners